Maifest (or Mayfest in English) is the traditional German celebration of the arrival of spring. Maifest is still celebrated throughout Germany with the maibaum (maypole) decorated to show off the history and crafts of the town.

Maifest, similar to Oktoberfest, has now become a popular celebration throughout the world. Several communities in the United States celebrate Maifest yearly. It has been celebrated in Cincinnati, Ohio, United States since 1873.

Brenham, Texas has celebrated Maifest since 1880. Over the years, the celebration has become a community-wide tradition, drawing spectators and participants from all parts of the community. The beginning of Maifest is treated as a town holiday, with Brenham ISD releasing students early on the Friday before.

The town of Hermann, Missouri also celebrates Maifest, on the third weekend of May.

References

Culture of Bavaria